Joseph Egan (26 March 1919 – 11 November 2012) was an English professional rugby league footballer who played in the 1930s, 1940s and 1950s, and coached in the 1950s, 1960s and 1970s. Egan is a Wigan Hall of Fame inductee, and was a life member at Wigan, 
Egan later became coach of Wigan, taking them to Championship success in the 1959–60 season.

Background

Joe Egan was born in Wigan, Lancashire, England, and he died aged 93 in Wigan, Greater Manchester, England.

Playing career

Wigan

Egan played  for a Rugby League XIII against Northern Command XIII at Thrum Hall, Halifax on Saturday 21 March 1942. During the 1943–44 season Egan played , and scored a drop goal in Wigan's 13-9 victory over Dewsbury in the Championship Final first-leg at Central Park, Wigan on Saturday 13 May 1944, and played , and scored a try in the 12-5 victory over Dewsbury in the Championship Final second-leg at Crown Flatt, Dewsbury on Saturday 20 May 1944.

He also won two Championships with Wigan in the 1945–46 season, and the 1946–47 season. He accompanied the Great Britain test team as hooker on their tour of Australia in 1946 and 1948. During the 1946–47 season he played  in the 9–3 victory over Belle Vue Rangers in the 1946–47 Lancashire Cup Final at Station Road, Swinton on Saturday 26 October 1946. During the 1947–48 season he played  in the 10–7 victory over Belle Vue Rangers in the 1947–48 Lancashire Cup Final at Wilderspool Stadium, Warrington on Saturday 1 November 1947. During the 1947–48 season Egan played  and was captain in Wigan's 8-3 victory over Bradford Northern in the 1947–48 Challenge Cup Final at Wembley Stadium, London on Saturday 1 May 1948, in front of a crowd of 91,465. He was the first captain to receive the trophy from a reigning monarch, King George VI. On the same day former  with Egan on the indomitables tour Frank Whitcombe of Bradford Northern, was the first man to win the Lance Todd trophy on the losing side. Joe Egan, Frank Whitcombe & Ken Gee formed a formidable front row in the first two test which the Australians feared on the tour to Australia in 1946, he later became the oldest surviving member.

Oldham

Leigh

During the 1951–52 season Egan played  and was the coach in Leigh's 6-14 defeat by Wigan in the 1951–52 Lancashire Cup Final at Station Road, Swinton on Saturday 27 October 1951, in front of a crowd of 33,230. During the 1952–53 season he played  and was the coach in the 22-5 victory over St. Helens in the 1952–53 Lancashire Cup Final at Station Road, Swinton on Saturday 29 November 1952, in front of a crowd of 34,785.

Coaching career

Leigh

Egan remained with Leigh purely as coach for the season after he had retired from playing, and finished 11th in his last season with Leigh. During the 1955–56 season Egan was the coach in Leigh's 26-9 victory over Widnes in the 1955–56 Lancashire Cup Final at Central Park, Wigan on Saturday 15 October 1955, in front of a crowd of 26,504.

Wigan

During the 1957–58 season Egan was the coach in Wigan's 13–9 victory over Workington Town in the 1957–58 Challenge Cup Final at Wembley Stadium, London on Saturday 10 May 1958, in front of a crowd of 66,109. During the 1958–59 season he was the coach in the 30-13 victory over Hull F.C. in the 1958–59 Challenge Cup Final at Wembley Stadium, London on Saturday 9 May 1959, in front of a crowd of 79,811, During the 1960–61 season Egan was coach in the 6-12 defeat by St. Helens in the 1960–61 Challenge Cup Final at Wembley Stadium, London on Saturday 13 May 1961, in front of a crowd of 94,672.

Warrington

Egan later coached Warrington. During the 1967–68 season Egan was the coach in Warrington's 2–2 draw with St. Helens in the 1967–68 Lancashire Cup Final at Central Park, Wigan on Saturday 7 October 1967, and the 10–13 defeat by St. Helens in the 1967–68 Lancashire Cup Final replay at Station Road, Swinton on Saturday 2 December 1967. After a disastrous start to the 1970–71 season, Joe Egan decided to stand down, and he was replaced by Peter Harvey.

References

External links
Joe Egan: 'I'm not so bad for a 90-year-old'

1919 births
2012 deaths
Blackpool Borough coaches
British Home Guard soldiers
England national rugby league team captains
England national rugby league team players
English rugby league coaches
English rugby league players
Great Britain national rugby league team players
Lancashire rugby league team players
Leigh Leopards captains
Leigh Leopards coaches
Leigh Leopards players
Oldham R.L.F.C. players
Rugby league hookers
Rugby league players from Wigan
Rugby League XIII players
Warrington Wolves coaches
Widnes Vikings coaches
Wigan Warriors captains
Wigan Warriors coaches
Wigan Warriors players